Tubby the Tuba may refer to:
"Tubby the Tuba" (song), a song by Paul Tripp and George Kleinsinger
Tubby the Tuba (1947 film), a George Pal Puppetoon movie short based on the song
Tubby the Tuba (1975 film). an animated film based on the song

See also
The Manhattan Transfer Meets Tubby the Tuba, an album